Cure is a Japanese rock music and fashion magazine published monthly. It features the latest visual kei bands as well as fashion and styling tips. It also has the latest news and trends on the visual kei music scene. Different artists are featured on the front and back cover every month. Regularly featured bands include Diaura, Mejibray, Royz, Blu-Billion, ARLEQUIN, BAROQUE, R-Shitei, BugLug, Sadie, DaizyStripper and DuelJewel. The magazine originally focused on lesser-known visual kei bands than those covered by magazines like Shoxx.

The magazine also features fashion snapshot cruisings of fans from all over the world attending visual kei and Jrock shows. Originally a print publication, it switched to an online, digital format in 2022.

Columns 
Popular columns within the magazine:

Exclusive Photos - Live Report and After Interview of popular Visual kei bands

Band Close ups - one on one interviews

Band Pick up - Interviews and reports on the newest hot bands

Live Reports - Jrock and Visual Kei band concert reports

Style Counseling - Hot Fashion brands and styling from Cure and the bands

Special Columns - Newest live house and music release information, Snap Shot Cruising, close pick up of bands personal activities

Overseas Shows and Events
Cure Magazine has been known for bringing Visual kei and Jrock bands oversea for shows and panel sessions for the past years including
Riku (Chariots), Kuro (VelBet), GaGaaling at Anime Expo 2008, Kaya at PMX 2008, Dio & Sugar at OniCon 2008 Texas, Auncia & Satsuki at Anime Expo 2009, ALSDEAD & Satsuki at Anime Vegas 2009, Born & Satsuki at Onicon 2009 Texas, MYM (Gagaaling) at Anime Boston 2010, SADIE Live at AM2 Los Angeles 2011, CELL at ANIME EXPO 2013, and Los Angeles VK and Idol Fest 2014.

The Official Cure Magazine Shop in Los Angeles, XENON has been providing U.S. fans to interact with bands through Livestream Q&A session events since August 2014. Well known bands including CELL, Diaura, Royz, DaizyStripper, Grieva, Lin -End of World Corruption, Arlequin, The Rhedoric, and Pentagon have been welcomed to the event.

The magazine organized a visual kei festival in April 2016, with foreign visual bands attending, as well as Japanese bands like Diaura, Mejibray and Clowd.

References

External links

2003 establishments in Japan
2022 disestablishments in Japan
Defunct magazines published in Japan
Magazines established in 2003
Magazines disestablished in 2022
Magazines published in Tokyo
Monthly magazines published in Japan
Music magazines
Online magazines with defunct print editions